Husky Stadium is a 4,400-seat multipurpose stadium located in St. Cloud, Minnesota.  It was built in 2004 and is the home of the St. Cloud State University Huskies soccer teams. It was home to the university's football team from 2004 until 2019 when the program was cut. The stadium is also used for high school football and soccer games. Also, St. Cloud State University uses the stadium for intramural sports, such as football and Soccer. It was built on the location of old Husky Stadium.

During the winter, an inflatable dome covers the field, allowing the stadium to be used for indoor softball. The Dome is the largest inflatable dome in a five-state history. The stadium's press box features three radio booths as well as a television booth.

References

External links
Husky Stadium, St. Cloud State University
Husky Stadium

College football venues
High school football venues in the United States
Soccer venues in Minnesota
College softball venues in the United States
Buildings and structures in St. Cloud, Minnesota
St. Cloud State Huskies football
2004 establishments in Minnesota